Mitchell Clegg (born 12 November 1990) is an Australian professional darts player. He lives in Newcastle, New South Wales. Clegg won the Oceanic Masters title at the age of just 15 years, 345 days. This meant he was the youngest player ever to qualify for the PDC World Darts Championship.

His debut at the 2007 PDC World Championship ended in the first round with a 0–3 defeat to Raymond van Barneveld who went on to win his fifth world title.

After his World Championship experience, Clegg competed in the AGP tour affiliated with the PDC as well as competing in WDF ranked events in Oceania but has failed to gain much success thus far.  He reached the final of the 2009 Central Coast Australian Classic but lost 6–0 in the final to Anthony Fleet.

World Championship results

PDC
 2007: Last 64: (lost to Raymond van Barneveld 0–3) (sets)

References

External links
 Stats on Darts Database

1990 births
Australian darts players
Living people
British Darts Organisation players
Professional Darts Corporation associate players